1,3-Diphenylurea is a phenylurea-type compound with the formula (PhNH)2CO (Ph = C6H5).  It is a colorless solid that is prepared by transamidation of urea with aniline.

DPU is a cytokinin, a type of plant hormone that induces flower development. It occurs in coconut milk. The cytokinin effect of DPU is relatively low, but other more potent phenylurea-type cytokinins have been reported.

References

External links 
 

Cytokinins
Ureas